Swimming at the 2011 Summer Universiade was contested from August 13 to August 19 in Shenzhen, China. The competition featured 40 long course (50m) pool events and 2 open water events, held at the Universiade Center Aquatic Center and the Seven Star Bay, respectively. This edition marked the first time an open water event was held at a Universiade.

Participating nations
Countries with swimmers at the 2011 World University Games included:

Event schedule

Open water
Saturday, August 13, 2011: Men's 10 km marathon (8:00 a.m.), women's 10 km marathon (8:15 a.m.)

Pool

m= men's event, w= women's event
Preliminaries begin daily at 9:00 a.m., finals at 7:00 p.m. All events are preliminary/final, expect the 800 m and 1500 m freestyle events, which are timed final events (all swim only once, fastest heat swims with finals).

Medal summary

Medal table

Men's events

Women's events

References

2011 in swimming
2011 Summer Universiade events
Swimming at the Summer Universiade